"Queens Behind Bars" is the fourth episode of the fourth season of the American reality competition television series RuPaul's Drag Race, which aired on Logo on February 20, 2012. The episode has contestants pose for fake mug shots for the mini challenge, and to act in the mock prison sitcom "Hot In Tuckahoe" for the main challenge. Max Mutchnick and Nicole Sullivan serve as guest judges, alongside regular panellists Billy B, RuPaul, and Michelle Visage.

Episode

Mini Challenge 

The ten remaining contestants are told to pair up to pose for fake mug shots. The pairs are as follows:

 Madame LaQueer and Willam
Chad Michaels and Sharon Needles
 DiDa Ritz and Jiggly Caliente
 Kenya Michaels and Phi Phi O'Hara
Latrice Royale and Milan

The queens are handcuffed together and have to do each other's prison style make-up. Madame LaQueer and Willam win the challenge for their blue dye pack inspired looks making them team captains for the maxi challenge.

Main Challenge 
For the main challenge, the queens star in the mock sitcom "Hot In Tuckahoe" starring four friends and one butch prison guard, "Large Marge". Madame LaQueer's team is made up of DiDa, Kenya, Milan, and Sharon and Phi Phi, Latrice, Chad, and Jiggly are on Willam's team. The queen's are directed by Will and Grace co-creator Max Mutchnick. He mentors the teams as they act in two innuendo-filled episodes, "Dressed in Beaver" starring team Madame LaQueer and "Mr Happy's Tasty Nuts" with team Willam. Latrice is cast as the prison guard and Ru asks if she will draw on personal experience as she previously served time. While directing Max Mutchnick specifically praises DiDa and Latrice for their performances. Back in the workroom, Phi Phi and Sharon fight after Sharon reveals she criticised Phi Phi's leadership skills the previous week on the main stage. This leads to a heated argument and Phi Phi tells Sharon to "Go back to Party City where you belong", criticising Sharon's 'costume' like drag, one of the most famous quotes from the show.

Runway 

RuPaul introduces guest judges Max Mutchnick and Nicole Sullivan, and reveals the runway theme for the runway category: "Television Premiere" (red carpet style outfits).

On the main stage, the judges watch the performances of both groups and Ru declares Willam's team as the winners and Latrice as the winner of the challenge for her performance as "Large Marge". She wins a cruise courtesy of the company AlandChuck.travel. Willam's team are all declared safe and head backstage while Madame LaQueer's team are critiqued. Kenya and Milan are both praised for their runway looks but criticised for their acting in the challenge. The judges also note that Madame LaQueer made poor casting choices and performed badly in the challenge. DiDa is highly praised for her performance in the challenge but has negative critiques of her outfit. Max Mutchnick also critiques Sharon for speaking back when being directed but Nicole complements her unusual character. DiDa, Sharon, and Kenya are declared safe and Madame LaQueer and Milan lipsync to "Trouble" by P!NK.

Milan wins the lip sync and Madame LaQueer is eliminated from the competition.

Reception 
Oliver Sava of The A.V. Club said the mini challenge was "a brilliant challenge, forcing the queens to put their faces in the hands of another, and the smart pairs take advantage of the handicap and create a story around their messy makeup."

The performances in the main challenge were criticised by Mark Peikert from Out magazine who says "The sitcoms are… leaden, I guess is the word. The judges cackle good-naturedly, but they’re mostly only impressed with Latrice and DiDa."

Legacy 
Latrice reprised the role of "Large Marge" for a mini challenge on season 7 episode 8 where the queens had to dress up as prisoners in "Tuckahoe Prison for Ladies". She also repurposed a quote from the episode, "Get those nuts away from my face!" as her entrance quote on the Holi-slay Spectacular episode where she entered saying "Get those chestnuts away from my face!"

References

External links 
 Queens Behind Bars at IMDb

2012 American television episodes
American LGBT-related television episodes
RuPaul's Drag Race episodes